is a railway station on the Keikyu Zushi Line in Zushi, Kanagawa, Japan, operated by the private railway operator Keikyu.

Lines
It is located 4.1 km from the junction at Kanazawa-hakkei Station, and 45.0 km from the starting point of the line at Shinagawa Station.

Station layout
Jimmuji Station has two side platforms serving two tracks. The platforms are connected by a level crossing for passenger use. A dedicated entrance and exit is provided on the north side of the station for US Navy personnel, which links directly to the adjoining Ikego housing complex.

On the north side of the station are narrow gauge storage tracks used for transferring rolling stock from J-TREC's Yokohama factory to JR East's tracks at Zushi Station.

Platforms

History

Jimmuji Station opened on April 1, 1931, as a temporary stop on the Shōnan Electric Railway, the predecessor to the current Keikyu. It was initially located 300 meters towards Kanagawa Hakkei than the present station. It became a full station on June 11, 1936. In 1942, the Shōnan Electric Railway became part of the Tokyu Corporation, and Jimmuji Station was relocated to its present address on September 1, 1944. In 1948, the Keihin Electric Railway (later Keikyu) spun out from the Tokyu Corporation. A new station building was completed in March 2007.

Keikyū introduced station numbering to its stations on 21 October 2010; Jimmuji Station was assigned station number KK52.

Surrounding area
 CFAY Ikego Housing Detachment
 Kanagawa Prefectural Zushi High School

See also
 List of railway stations in Japan

References

 Miura, Kazuo. Keikyū　Kakuekiteisha to Kamakura Monogatari. Inban Publishing　(1998).

External links

  

Railway stations in Kanagawa Prefecture
Stations of Keikyu
Keikyū Zushi Line
Railway stations in Japan opened in 1931